Maysa: Quando Fala o Coração (English: Maysa - When the heart sings) is a 2009 Brazilian miniseries written by Manoel Carlos and directed by Jayme Monjardim. It's starring Larissa Maciel in the role of Maysa Matarazzo.

In 2009, was nominated for Best TV Movie/Mini-Series at the 37th International Emmy Awards.

Plot
At seventeen, filled with dreams and hopes, Maysa marries the love of her life, Andre Matarazzo, an industry titan with whom she has her only son, Jayme Monjardim. The strictness of life in the family mansion, however, contrasts with the festive and artistic environment in which she grew up. Despite Andre’s opposition, Maysa’s superb voice lands her an invitation to record an album, and her music becomes an instant success. Maysa’s new, demanding career results in the collapse of her marriage and takes a toll on her relationship with Jayme. In search of professional achievement, she risks everything and immerses her body and soul into singing. She earns standing ovations while crisscrossing the globe. Once divorced, she engages in turbulent relationships. She breaks taboos and defies conventions. And she dies tragically and prematurely. Maysa - when the heart sings: the story of a woman ahead of her time, who gave herself to life and to love with the same intensity as she composed and performed.

Cast
Larissa Maciel — Maysa
Eduardo Semerjian — André Matarazzo
Mateus Solano — Ronaldo Bôscoli
Jayme Matarazzo — Jayme Monjardim (young)
Nelson Baskerville — Alcebíades Monjardim (Monja)
Ângela Dip — Ináh Monjardim
Marat Descartes — Carlos Alberto
Cristine Perón — Nara Leão
Priscilla Rozenbaum — Ana
Denise Weinberg — Amália
Pablo Bellini — Miguel Azanza
Melissa Vettore — Gabriela
Simone Soares — Nina 
Beto Matos — Régis
Caio Sóh — Guto (Augusto)
Cristiane Carniato — Marlene
Fátima Montenegro — Yvone
Rogério Falabella — Andrea Matarazzo
André Matarazzo — Jayme Monjardim (child)

Ratings 

Rating average: 26,1 in Grande São Paulo.

Awards and nominations

International Exhibition

References

External links 
 
 

Brazilian television miniseries
2009 Brazilian television series debuts
2009 Brazilian television series endings
Portuguese-language television shows
Television series based on singers and musicians